Lebe may refer to:

People
 Clément Lebe (born 1979), Cameroonian football player
 David Lebe (born 1948), American photographer
  (1935-2014), German publicist

Places
 Lebe, Pauk, Myanmar

Other
 Lebe (Dogon), religious festival

German verb for live
The word "lebe" appears in the titles of books and films because it is the present first person singular of the verb live (e.g. "I live") as well as the subjunctive present first and third person singular (e.g. "that he lives") and the imperative second person singular (e.g. "live! (you)")